TV 2 Sport (formerely TV 2 Sport and TV2 Sportskanalen), currently stylized as TV 2 Sport 1 and TV 2 Sport 2, is a Norwegian channel, formerly Pay-TV, that shows sports. The channel is spread out over 2 different channels, named TV 2 Sport 1 and TV 2 Sport 2, earlier TV2 Sport 1-5. It heavily features football, including broadcasting of the Norwegian top division for several years. This channel also broadcasts international matches, such as the Premier League. It also broadcast four 2010 World Cup matches.

History 
The channel was launched on 24 March 2007 from Canal Digital, Get, Lyse and BKK. In the autumn, it launched on the terrestrial RiksTV. From 22 March 2009 the channel will also be available from the Viasat satellite platform.

The channel is a premium pay channel with a relatively high price (159 NOK per month, as of 2009). In addition to the main channel, it also offered four extra channels, TV 2 Sport 2, TV 2 Sport 3, TV 2 Sport 4 and TV 2 Sport 5, which allowed them to broadcast five matches at once. The extra channels were, however, not available terrestrially.

On 11 June 2010, TV 2 launched TV 2 Sport Premium (previously TV 2 Barclays Premier League HD), which contains two sport channels. TV 2 Sport Premium Broadcasts live matches from Premier League, the FA Cup, Scottish Premiership, Allsvenskan and SHL.

In 2012 the channel was rebranded to a 24 hours sports channel named TV 2 Sportskanalen. In 2013 the resolution was changed from SD to HD. In 2018, Sportskanalen changed its name to TV 2 Sport 2, the other channel name is TV 2 Sport 1.

Coverage 
 Football
 FIFA World Cup qualification
 UEFA European Championship qualifying
 UEFA Nations League
 UEFA Europa League
 CONCACAF Gold Cup
 Africa Cup of Nations
 Premier League
 Allsvenskan
 Serie A
 
 Ice hockey
 GET-ligaen
 Swedish Hockey League (via CMore)
 Handball
 REMA 1000-ligaen for men
 REMA 1000-ligaen for women
 Cycling
 Tour de France

On-air staff

Current on-air staff 
 Game broadcasters
 Kasper Wikestad - hockey play-by-play announcer, studio analyst
 Marius Skjelbæk - hockey play-by-play announcer, studio analyst
 Bjørn Erevik - hockey color analyst
 Erik Follestad - hockey sideline reporter, studio analyst
 Ole Eskil Dahlstrøm - hockey color analyst, studio analyst
 Geir Hoff - studio analyst

References

External links 
 
 Information relating to TV 2 Sport

TV 2 (Norway)
Television channels and stations established in 2007
2007 establishments in Norway
Television channels in Norway